Talkhab (also Romanized as Talkhāb; also known as Talkhān) is a village in Dustan Rural District, Badreh District, Darreh Shahr County, Ilam Province, Iran. At the 2006 census, its population was 93, in 14 families.

References 

Populated places in Darreh Shahr County